Williams Field at Jack Katz Stadium is a field hockey stadium located on the East Campus of Duke University and is home to the Duke Blue Devils field hockey team. The stadium is also used for soccer and club football. 

Jack Katz Stadium broke ground in 1995 and was completed in 1996. The construction of the stadium was basically a transformation of an existing stadium that was located on the same site as Jack Katz Stadium. That stadium was called Hanes Field and was a minor league baseball and football stadium.

College field hockey venues in the United States
Duke Blue Devils field hockey
Sports venues in North Carolina
1996 establishments in North Carolina
Sports venues completed in 1996
Soccer venues in North Carolina
American football venues in North Carolina
Duke Blue Devils sports venues